Akiro Ito (born March 10, 1981) is a field hockey player from Japan, who finished in ninth place with the national squad at the 2006 Men's Hockey World Cup in Mönchengladbach. Before the start of the tournament he played 23 international matches for his native country, according to the official players list issued by the International Field Hockey Federation.

References

1981 births
Japanese male field hockey players
Living people
Field hockey players at the 2006 Asian Games
2006 Men's Hockey World Cup players
Place of birth missing (living people)
Asian Games competitors for Japan
21st-century Japanese people